A' Famosa Resort Malaysia is a family resort located in Alor Gajah, Malacca, Malaysia, near the Simpang Ampat exit on the North–South Expressway. It was named after the 16th century Portuguese fort of the same name which was once stood near the harbour of Malacca city. The logo of the resort also incorporates a stylized silhouette of the fort's gateway in the background.

Overview

Components
The  A’Famosa Safari Wonderland is a wildlife safari that is home to more than 100 species of the animals, featuring a Walk-through Area, Chicken Farm, Monkey Island, and a truck drive through the Safari park itself. The park also hosts a number of animal presentations, such as Elephant Encounter, Colour of the Birds, Animals Fun Play

The  A’Famosa Old West features a various entertainment outlets, such as restaurants, a shopping village, etc. There is also a nightly carnival which consists of an animal musical parade, dancing and fireworks.

The accommodation available at A’Famosa Resort consists of a resort hotel with balconies. This facility offers self-contained studios, 2-bedroom and 3-bedroom units, and villas ranging from three to five bedrooms.

Freeport A'Famosa Outlet, offers over 80 brands of fashion, sports and accessories with a total size of 180,000 sq.ft. The Mall features with a lake, fountains, carousel and windmill  with architecture loosely themed on Malacca’s Dutch heritage. In July 2014, A'Famosa Resort made the largest ketupat replica in Malaysia which was recorded in the Malaysia Book of Records (MBOR)

Transportation
A Famosa Resort is a 10-minute drive via Federal Route 61 from  KTM Komuter Tampin (Pulau Sebang).

Gallery

See also
 List of tourist attractions in Malacca

References

External links
 

Amusement parks in Melaka
1992 establishments in Malaysia